The 2014 Pirelli World Challenge season was the 25th season of the Pirelli World Challenge championship. It marked the debut of a new "Touring Car A-Spec" class. A new "GT A-Spec" class also made its debut. These new classes featured amateur drivers. The series also held a round at Brainerd International Raceway for the first time in its history, with a touring car doubleheader held in support of a Trans Am Series event; also making its series debut was Barber Motorsports Park. The GT groups competed in sixteen fifty-minute sprints on nine circuits. The touring cars competed in fourteen sprints on seven road courses. The first race for GT cars at St. Petersburg was canceled due to heavy rain, so a make-up race was added for the series finale at Miller Motorsports Park. The second race for touring cars at Barber was also canceled due to rain, so a make-up race was added to the schedule at Mosport.

In the GT championship, three wins at the first four meetings – at Long Beach and a double at Belle Isle – along with consistent finishing thereafter was enough to give Johnny O'Connell a third consecutive series title at the wheel of his Cadillac CTS-V. O'Connell finished 156 points clear of his closest championship rival, Mike Skeen, who also won three races during the season; he achieved a double victory at Road America along with a win at Sonoma Raceway, driving an Audi R8 LMS ultra. The championship top three was completed by Anthony Lazzaro at the wheel of a Ferrari 458 GT3. Lazzaro finished 30 points behind Skeen, taking victories at Barber Motorsports Park and the second race at Sonoma Raceway. Seven other drivers won race in the class in 2014; the only driver to win more than one race was Ryan Dalziel, who took a double win at Mid-Ohio. Single race victories were taken by Andrew Palmer (Barber Motorsports Park) and Tomáš Enge (St. Petersburg), while the Toronto races were won by Kuno Wittmer and Nick Tandy, and the Miller Motorsports Park races were won by Robert Thorne and Guy Smith. The GTA class held within the GT championship was won by Michael Mills, who finished in eighth place in the overall GT standings. Cadillac won the Manufacturers' Championship by five points ahead of Audi.

In the GTS class, four-time race winner Lawson Aschenbach took his second straight series title, finishing 50 points clear of his closest competitor, Jack Baldwin, who won three races. Both drivers took advantage of Mark Wilkins suffering a pointless final weekend at Miller Motorsports Park, which dropped him 108 points behind Aschenbach in the final standings. Wilkins had finished each of the previous races in the top ten, including victories at Barber Motorsports Park and Toronto. Dean Martin took a double victory at Belle Isle and added a third victory in Toronto en route to fourth in the championship. Niclas Jönsson also achieved a double victory – at Road America – having previously won at Long Beach, but no points in the final four races of the season dropped him to seventh in the final championship standings. The season's only other winner was Nick Esayian, who won the first race at Miller Motorsports Park. In the Manufacturers' Championship, Kia claimed the title by six points ahead of Ford.

In TC, only Michael DiMeo was able to win more than two races during the season, but his eight victories allowed him to win the class title by nearly 500 points over Karl Thomson, who was a race winner at Brainerd. Third place, a further 82 points in arrears, was Adam Poland, who won races at Road America and Miller Motorsports Park. Steven Doherty won the other races at Road America and Miller Motorsports Park en route to fourth in the championship, while the other Brainerd race winner was Fred Emich, who finished fifth in the championship. Honda comfortably won the Manufacturers' Championship. TCA class honors were taken by Jason Wolfe, who won five races on his way to the championship. Wolfe finished 207 points clear of another five-time winner, Shea Holbrook, while a further 24 points behind in third place was Ernie Francis, Jr., who won a trio of races, including a double at Brainerd. Aside from his GTS foray, Jönsson achieved a victory at Miller Motorsports Park. Kia won the Manufacturers' Championship on a tie-break with Honda, by six wins to five.

TCB championship honors went to Brian Price, at the wheel of a Honda Fit. Price won four races at the first three meetings – Barber Motorsports Park, Canadian Tire Motorsport Park and New Jersey Motorsports Park – and added a fifth win at the final meeting at Miller Motorsports Park. Price won the title by 125 points ahead of Nathan Stacy, who was the other winner at Canadian Tire Motorsport Park. Third place went to Tyler Palmer, 58 points behind Stacy, taking victories at New Jersey Motorsports Park and Mid-Ohio. The season's other multiple winner was Johan Schwartz, who won three of the final four races at Brainerd and Miller Motorsports Park. The season's other winners were Glenn Nixon at Road America, and Chase Pelletier at Mid-Ohio. In the Manufacturers' Championship, Honda finished 25 points clear of the next best manufacturer, Mini.

Schedule

Source:

News

On January 7, 2014, it was announced that Pirelli, WC Vision had agreed to a five-year extension to their Title and Official Tire Partnership for the World Challenge Championships.

On January 6, 2014, it was announced that the TV broadcast partnership with NBC Sports Network had been renewed for 2014.

On December 24, 2013, it was announced that the Reiter Engineering Lamborghini Gallardo FL2 GT3 would be homologated for competition.

On October 28, 2013, it was announced that the Porsche 911 GT3 R would be homologated for competition.

The March 29 race was canceled due to heavy rain. Only qualifying points were awarded.

Entries

GT

TC

TCA

Race results

Championship standings

Drivers' Championships
Championship points were awarded to drivers based on qualifying and finishing positions. The driver had to complete at least 70% of the winner's number of laps to receive points. The Pole position winner received 7 points. In addition, 1 bonus point was awarded to a driver leading a lap during a race, and 3 bonus points were awarded to the driver leading the most laps. The driver who set the fastest lap of the race received 1 bonus point.

GT

Notes
 Results denoted by † did not complete sufficient laps in order to score points.

GTS

Notes
 Results denoted by † did not complete sufficient laps in order to score points.

TC

Notes
 Results denoted by † did not complete sufficient laps in order to score points.

TCA

Notes
 Results denoted by † did not complete sufficient laps in order to score points.

TCB

Notes
 Results denoted by † did not complete sufficient laps in order to score points.

Manufacturers' Championships
Manufacturer points were awarded according to the highest-finishing car from that manufacturer. Only manufacturers that were SCCA Pro Racing corporate members received points. Points were awarded on the following basis:

In addition, one bonus point was awarded to the pole-winning manufacturer. In the table below, the manufacturer's top finishing position is shown, with pole winner in bold.

GT

GTS

TC

TCA

TCB

References

Pirelli World Challenge
GT World Challenge America